This is a list of songs performed by Hannah Montana and songs used in the Disney Channel series Hannah Montana (2006–2011) and its film, The Hannah Montana Movie (2009).

All songs are sung by Miley Cyrus as Hannah Montana unless otherwise noted. All songs are listed by order of album released, then by appearance in the series. Songs are not included if they are one line or shorter.

First season: 2006–2007

Second season: 2007–2008

Third season: 2008–2010

Hannah Montana: The Movie: 2009

Fourth season: 2010–2011

Notes
A. ^ "I Want My Mullet Back" and "Stand" both appeared in the series but did not appear on a soundtrack. Both songs later appeared on Billy Ray Cyrus' ninth studio album Wanna Be Your Joe (2006).

B. ^ The solo version of "If We Were a Movie" appeared in the first season of the series and on Hannah Montana (2006).The song later appeared on the second season, as a duet with Corbin Bleu.

C. ^ "Rockin' Around the Christmas Tree" did not appear in the series, and only appeared on Hannah Montana: Holiday Edition 

D. ^ "My Kids Are All Gone", "Cheese Jerky" and "We're Walking Down the Beach Because We're Mega Stars" were used in the series to add comedy, and did not appear on any soundtrack.

E. ^ "Bone Dance", "Super Carrot" and "I'm Just Having Fun" are all variations of other songs. "Bone Dance" is a variation of "Nobody's Perfect", "Super Carrot" is a variation of "Supergirl" and "I'm Just Having Fun" is a variation of "He Could Be the One".

F. ^ The solo version of "Life's What You Make It" was performed in the series, and was featured on the soundtrack. The song was performed again later in the series by Miley Cyrus, as a duet with Joey Fatone.

G. ^ During the series, "You and Me Together" was performed by Miley Cyrus as a duet with Brooke Shields. The song was later released on the soundtrack in a solo form.

H. ^ "If Cupid Had a Heart" and "I Used to be a Nice Girl" appeared in the series, but did not appear on the soundtrack.

I. ^ "Ready, Set, Don't Go" was performed in the series by Billy Ray Cyrus, and the song did not appear on the soundtrack. The song was later re-recorded with Miley Cyrus and released as a single from his tenth studio album, Home at Last (2007).

J. ^ The duet version of "We Got the Party" with the Jonas Brothers appeared in the series, while the solo version did not. The solo version was released on Hannah Montana 2: Meet Miley Cyrus, while the duet version appeared only on the Rockstar Edition of the album.

K. ^ "Supergirl" is first heard in "He Ain't a Hottie, He's My Brother," where Robby sings a brief excerpt while writing the song. However, the song is performed more fully in "Welcome to the Bungle," and is also the first time Hannah sings the song.

L. ^ "Single Dad Blues" was performed in the series by Billy Ray Cyrus, but failed to appear on the soundtrack.

M. ^ In the series, "I Wanna Know You" was performed with David Archuleta. Two versions of the song appeared on the soundtrack: the duet with David Archuleta, and a solo version of the song.

N. ^ The narrative songs featured in the episode include:
Smothers Brothers parody
Scottish song to the tune of "The Irish Washerwoman"
Blues Brothers parody
Reggae song
Disco song parody, to the tune of "I Will Survive"
Scene change music cue, Hannah Montana parody
Minstrel song to the tune of "Greensleeves"
Pop song to the tune of "Best of Both Worlds", Hannah Montana parody

O. ^ The version of "Let's Do This" performed by Mitchel Musso did not appear on the soundtrack. "Welcome to Hollywood", also performed by Mitchel Musso was performed in the series, and was not featured on the soundtrack as well, although it later appeared on his self-titled debut album (2009).

P. ^ "Just a Girl" appeared on the soundtrack, but was not featured in the series.

The narrative songs in the episode include:
Alvin and the Chipmunks parody, to the tune of "Camptown Races"
Electronic song
Show tune parody
Old-time song
Show tune parody
Western song
Lady Gaga's "Bad Romance" parody
Lullaby to the tune of "Twinkle Twinkle Little Star"

References

Montana, Hannah
Disney-related lists
Disney songs